was a railway station located in Kisen 3-gō, Pippu, Hokkaidō, operated by the Hokkaido Railway Company. The station closed on March 13, 2021.

Lines Serviced
Hokkaido Railway Company
Sōya Main Line

Adjacent stations

External links
Ekikara Time Table - JR Minami-Pippu Station 

Railway stations in Hokkaido Prefecture
Railway stations in Japan opened in 1959
Railway stations closed in 2021